The First Battle of Fort Wagner was fought on July 10 and 11, 1863, on Morris Island in Charleston harbor during the American Civil War. An attempt by the Union Army to capture Fort Wagner was repulsed. The more famous Second Battle of Fort Wagner, which involved an assault by the 54th Massachusetts, would be fought on July 18.

Background

In early June 1863, Union Brig. Gen. Quincy A. Gillmore replaced Maj. Gen. David Hunter as commander of the Department of the South. Gillmore, an Army engineer, had successfully captured Fort Pulaski in April 1862. He began preparations for capturing Morris Island and parts of James Island, which dominated the southern approaches to Charleston Harbor. If Union artillery could be placed in those locations, they could assist in the bombardment of Fort Sumter, whose guns prevented the U.S. Navy from entering the harbor.

Opposing forces

Union

Confederate

Battle

On July 10, Union shot artillery on Folly Island (which had been occupied in April 1863) and naval gunfire from Rear Admiral John A. Dahlgren's four ironclad warships bombarded the Confederate defenses protecting the southern end of Morris Island. This provided cover for the landing of Brig. Gen. George C. Strong's brigade, which crossed Lighthouse Inlet and landed at the southern tip of the island. Strong's troops advanced, capturing several batteries, moving about three miles to within range of Fort Wagner. Also known as Battery Wagner, it was a heavily gunned redoubt that covered nearly the entire width of the northern end of Morris Island, facing Sumter. Strong's report described the advance:

On July 11, Strong's brigade attacked at dawn, advancing through a thick fog, attempting to seize Fort Wagner. Although the men of the 7th Connecticut Infantry overran a line of rifle pits, they were repulsed by the 1,770-man force under Confederate Col. Robert F. Graham. Heavy artillery fire from Fort Wagner prevented other units from joining the attack.

Aftermath
Union casualties were 339 (49 killed, 123 wounded, 167 missing), Confederate 12. The First Battle of Fort Wagner was followed on July 16 by assaults on James Island and on July 18 by the famous, but also unsuccessful, charge of the 54th Massachusetts Infantry on July 18 in the Second Battle of Fort Wagner.

Battlefield preservation
In May 2008, TPL and partners, including the South Carolina Conservation Bank, the South Carolina State Ports Authority, the Civil War Trust, (a division of the American Battlefield Trust) and many private donors, purchased the island on behalf of the City of Charleston from Ginn Resorts for $3 million. Previously, in 2003, when a builder announced his plans to build houses on the tract, for which he had an option to buy, the Trust, local preservationist Blake Hallman and others formed the Morris Island Coalition, generated media attention and support for preservation and defeated the effort. Ginn Resorts was interested in developing the property, too, but ultimately decided to purchase it and then immediately sell it to the preservationists. According to TPL, the city and county are working "to complete a management plan to protect the island's nationally significant historical and natural resources."

Notes

References
 National Park Service battle description
 Dyer, Frederick H. A Compendium of the War of Rebellion: Compiled and Arranged From Official Records of the Federal and Confederate Armies, Reports of the Adjutant Generals of the Several States, The Army Registers and Other Reliable Documents and Sources. Dayton, OH: Morningside Books, 1978. . First published 1908 by Dyer Publishing.
 Eicher, David J. The Longest Night: A Military History of the Civil War. New York: Simon & Schuster, 2001. .
 Kennedy, Frances H., ed. The Civil War Battlefield Guide. 2nd ed. Boston: Houghton Mifflin Co., 1998. .

Further reading
 Burton, E. Milby. The Siege of Charleston 1861–1865. Columbia: University of South Carolina Press, 1970. .
 Reed, Rowena. Combined Operations in the Civil War. Annapolis, MD: Naval Institute Press, 1978. .
 Wise, Stephen R. Gate of Hell: Campaign for Charleston Harbor, 1863. Columbia: University of South Carolina Press, 1994. .

Operations against the Defenses of Charleston (American Civil War)
Battles of the Lower Seaboard Theater and Gulf Approach of the American Civil War
Confederate victories of the American Civil War
Battles of the American Civil War in South Carolina
Charleston County, South Carolina
Naval battles of the American Civil War
Conflicts in 1863
1863 in South Carolina
July 1863 events